Liolaemus signifer, the zodiac tree iguana, is a species of lizard in the family Liolaemidae. It is native to Chile, Bolivia, and Peru.

References

signifer
Reptiles of Chile
Reptiles of Bolivia
Reptiles of Peru
Reptiles described in 1837
Taxa named by André Marie Constant Duméril
Taxa named by Gabriel Bibron